Man bites dog is an aphoristic journalism expression.

Man Bites Dog may also refer to:

 Man Bites Dog (film), a 1992 Belgian mockumentary
 Man Bites Dog (TV series), a 1999 Flemish TV series
 "Man Bites Dog", a satirical column in The Irish Times (1971–1981) by Donal Foley
 Man Bites Dog (company), a British-headquartered public relations consultancy
 "Man Bites Dog", a song by Irving Berlin

See also
 Dog Bites Man, a 2006 American comedy TV series